Nonlygus is a genus of plant bugs in the family Miridae. There is at least one described species in Nonlygus, N. nubilatus.

References

Further reading

 
 
 
 
 
 
 

Miridae genera
Mirini